Leonard Delabere Bestall  (21 November 1895 – 22 March 1959) was a New Zealand architect, draper, museum director and benefactor. He was born in Wellington, New Zealand, on 21 November 1895.

In the 1949 King's Birthday Honours, Bestall was appointed a Member of the Order of the British Empire for services to art and music.

References

1895 births
1959 deaths
New Zealand architects
New Zealand philanthropists
New Zealand curators
New Zealand Members of the Order of the British Empire
20th-century philanthropists